Anders Eklund (22 December 1957 – 1 April 2010) was a Swedish boxer. He was nicknamed Lillen (Swedish: "Tiny"), but later chose the nickname "Viking".

Eklund was born in Gävle. He competed in the Heavyweight division (91 kg) at the 1980 Summer Olympics in Moscow, where he was defeated in the quarter finals. He made his pro debut on October 7, 1982, in Copenhagen. Eklund won the European (EBU) Heavyweight Title on March 9, 1985, by beating Steffen Tangstad, but lost the belt in his next fight, against Britain's Frank Bruno. He regained the title in 1987 against the Spaniard Alfredo Evangelista but lost it the same year against the Italian Francesco Damiani.

The magazine Boxing Illustrated named Eklund "A solid 10 round winning fighter" in a ranking in the early 1990s where he was deemed among the top 20. 
Eklund died of a heart attack on 1 April 2010, following a collapse at his Uppsala apartment. He was 52 years old.

Professional boxing record

|-
|align="center" colspan=8|19 Wins (10 knockouts, 9 decisions), 5 Losses (4 knockouts, 1 decision), 1 Draw 
|-
| align="center" style="border-style: none none solid solid; background: #e3e3e3"|Result
| align="center" style="border-style: none none solid solid; background: #e3e3e3"|Record
| align="center" style="border-style: none none solid solid; background: #e3e3e3"|Opponent
| align="center" style="border-style: none none solid solid; background: #e3e3e3"|Type
| align="center" style="border-style: none none solid solid; background: #e3e3e3"|Round
| align="center" style="border-style: none none solid solid; background: #e3e3e3"|Date
| align="center" style="border-style: none none solid solid; background: #e3e3e3"|Location
| align="center" style="border-style: none none solid solid; background: #e3e3e3"|Notes
|-
|Win
|19-5-1
|align=left| Garing Lane
|UD
|6
|17/05/1990
|align=left| Nordjysk Messecenter, Aars, Denmark
|align=left|
|-
|Loss
|18-5-1
|align=left| Tim Witherspoon
|KO 
|1 (10), 
|19/10/1989
|align=left| Trump Plaza Hotel and Casino, Atlantic City, New Jersey, U.S.
|align=left|
|-
|Win
|18-4-1
|align=left| Philipp Brown
|UD
|12
|16/03/1989
|align=left| Harrah's, Reno, Nevada, U.S.
|align=left|
|-
|Win
|17-4-1
|align=left| Rick Kellar
|KO
|3 (8), 
|12/12/1988
|align=left| Helsinki Ice Hall, Helsinki, Finland
|align=left|
|-
|Loss
|16-4-1
|align=left| Francesco Damiani
|KO
|6 (12), 
|09/10/1987
|align=left| Aosta, Italy
|align=left|
|-
|Win
|16-3-1
|align=left| Alfredo Evangelista
|KO
|7 (12)
|28/03/1987
|align=left| K.B. Hallen, Copenhagen, Denmark
|align=left|
|-
|Win
|15-3-1
|align=left| Stefano Vassallo
|UD
|8
|27/02/1987
|align=left| Randers Hallen, Randers, Denmark
|align=left|
|-
|Win
|14-3-1
|align=left| Jesse Ferguson
|PTS
|8
|17/10/1986
|align=left| Randers Hallen, Randers, Denmark
|align=left|
|-
|Win
|13-3-1
|align=left| Tony Foster
|KO
|2 (8), 
|03/10/1986
|align=left| Idraetshuset, Copenhagen, Denmark
|align=left|
|-
|Win
|12-3-1
|align=left| Glenn McCrory
|UD
|8
|18/04/1986
|align=left| Randers Hallen, Randers, Denmark
|align=left|
|-
|Loss
|11-3-1
|align=left| Frank Bruno
|KO
|4 (12), 
|01/10/1985
|align=left| Wembley Arena, London, England
|align=left|
|-
|Win
|11-2-1
|align=left| Steffen Tangstad
|TKO
|4 (12)
|09/03/1985
|align=left| Copenhagen, Denmark
|align=left|
|-
|Win
|10-2-1
|align=left| Dorcey Gaymon
|KO
|8 (8)
|09/11/1984
|align=left| Copenhagen, Denmark
|align=left|
|-
|Win
|9-2-1
|align=left| Rudy Gauwe
|TKO
|6 (8)
|27/10/1984
|align=left| Mariehamn, Finland
|align=left|
|-
|Win
|8-2-1
|align=left| Rocky Burton
|KO
|1 (8), 
|05/10/1984
|align=left| Randers Hallen, Randers, Denmark
|align=left|
|-
|Loss
|7-2-1
|align=left| Joe Bugner
|MD
|10
|13/01/1984
|align=left| Randers Hallen, Randers, Denmark
|align=left|
|-
|Win
|7-1-1
|align=left| Steve Gee
|TKO
|5 (8), 
|17/12/1983
|align=left| Hotel Arkipelag, Mariehamn, Finland
|align=left|
|-
|Loss
|6-1-1
|align=left| Noel Quarless
|TKO
|1 (10), 
|13/10/1983
|align=left| Crest Hotel, London, England
|align=left|
|-
|Draw
|6-0-1
|align=left| Guido Trane
|PTS
|6
|06/10/1983
|align=left| K.B. Hallen, Copenhagen, Denmark
|align=left|
|-
|Win
|6-0
|align=left| Paddy Finn
|KO
|1 (8), 
|14/09/1983
|align=left| Alexandra Palace, London, England
|align=left|
|-
|Win
|5-0
|align=left| Felipe Rodriguez
|PTS
|6
|08/04/1983
|align=left| K.B. Hallen, Copenhagen, Denmark
|align=left|
|-
|Win
|4-0
|align=left| Terry O'Connor
|PTS
|4
|11/02/1983
|align=left| K.B. Hallen, Copenhagen, Denmark
|align=left|
|-
|Win
|3-0
|align=left| Ricky James
|KO
|3 (4), 
|02/12/1982
|align=left| Randers Hallen, Randers, Denmark
|align=left|
|-
|Win
|2-0
|align=left| Theo Josephs
|PTS
|4
|05/11/1982
|align=left| K.B. Hallen, Copenhagen, Denmark
|align=left|
|-
|Win
|1-0
|align=left| Damien Marignan
|PTS
|4
|07/10/1982
|align=left| K.B. Hallen, Copenhagen, Denmark
|align=left|
|}

Sources
 Anders Eklund's obituary at Aftonbladet 

1957 births
2010 deaths
Boxers at the 1980 Summer Olympics
Olympic boxers of Sweden
Heavyweight boxers
People from Gävle
European Boxing Union champions
Swedish male boxers
Sportspeople from Gävleborg County